, aka , means going to a Zen master for instruction.  In the Rinzai school, it has the same meaning as dokusan, which is specifically a private interview between student and master, often centering on the student's grasp of an assigned koan.  If the master rings a bell to dismiss the student, this means the student's understanding is not right and that their work with the koan must continue. It is typically held twice a day in a monastery, though during a week-long sesshin sanzen may take place as often as four times in one day.

See also
Jikido
Jikijitsu
Keisaku

Notes

References

Zen